René Féret (26 May 1945 – 28 April 2015) was a French actor, screenwriter, film director and producer. 

His film Solemn Communion, was entered into the 1977 Cannes Film Festival. In The Man Who Wasn't There (L'Homme qui n'était pas là), his 1987 film adaption of Roderick MacLeish's novel, he played alongside Claude Jade in the leading role of Charles Elaine.

Very much an independent creator, Féret made several films around an invented family living in northern France, the Gravets, but based on his own life experience. He often used members of his own family in his films.

Féret also turned to marginal individuals, in trouble: a man sent to a psychiatric hospital in Histoire de Paul (1975), a hermaphrodite in Mystère Alexina, old age in Rue du Retrait (2000) and cancer sufferers in Comme une étoile dans la nuit (2009).

Later in his career he turned his attention to historical artistic figures (Nannerl, la sœur de Mozart, 2010), Anton Tchékhov 1890 (2015). He work was described as “subtil and possessing great sensibility”.

Filmography

References

External links

1945 births
2015 deaths
People from Nord (French department)
French male film actors
French male screenwriters
French screenwriters
French film directors
French film producers
20th-century French male actors